Tootill is a surname. Notable people with the surname include:

Alf Tootill (footballer, born 1908) (1908–1975), English football goalkeeper
Alf Tootill (footballer, born 1913) (1913–1984), English football defender
David Tootill (born 1986), English rugby player
Geoff Tootill (1922–2017), English electronic engineer and computer scientist
Robert Tootill (1850–1934), British politician